is a Japanese manga artist. She graduated with a degree in economics from Hitotsubashi University.

Yoshizumi started her career as a Japanese manga artist while working as an office lady. Her debut manga was a yomikiri (short story) called "Radical Romance" that was published in 1984, in the summer issue of Ribon Original. She is known as a social manga artist, and is a good friend of fellow manga artists Naoko Takeuchi, Ai Yazawa, Miho Obana, and Megumi Mizusawa.

As of 2011, Yoshizumi has had works serialized in Ribon, Chorus, and Margaret.

Works
 Quartet Game
 This tankōbon contains three early short stories. Along with the title story, the other stories are "Another Day" and "Heart Beat".
 Handsome na Kanojo (Handsome Girl) (9 volumes)
 Several volumes of this series include some more early short stories, including Wataru's debut work, "Radical Romance".
 Marmalade Boy (8 volumes)
 Kimi Shika Iranai (I Don't Need Anyone But You) (2 volumes)
 Mint na Bokura (We Are Mint) (6 volumes)
 Random Walk (3 volumes)
 Ultra Maniac (5 volumes)
 Datte Suki Nandamon (Because I Love You) (2 volumes)
 PxP (one-shot)
 Happiness (one-shot)
 Baby It's You (one-shot)
 Cherish (1 volume)
 Spicy Pink
 Cappuccino
 Chitose etc. (7 volumes)
 Marmalade Boy Little

References

Women manga artists
Manga artists from Tokyo
1963 births
Hitotsubashi University alumni
Living people
People from Tokyo
Japanese female comics artists
Female comics writers
Japanese women writers